NGC 2328 is a low-luminosity, early-type (lenticular) galaxy. It is located in the Puppis constellation. NGC 2328 is its New General Catalogue designation. It is located about 59 million light-years (18 Megaparsecs) away from the Sun.

NGC 2328 was imaged by the Hubble Space Telescope, revealing a ring of star clusters near the center of the galaxy. These star clusters are massive, and are consequently quite young as well.

References 

20046
2328
Puppis
Lenticular galaxies